A list of all international Test Matches played by the All Blacks

Legend

Overall 
New Zealand's overall Test Match record against all nations, updated to 20 November 2022, is as follows:

1900s

1910s

1920s

1930s

1940s

1950s

1960s

1970s

1980s

1990s

2000s

2010s

2020s

References

 
Lists of national rugby union team results
Matches